William Percival Sadlier (1896–1968) was an Australian rugby league footballer who played in the 1920s.

A product from the Brighton JRLFC, Bill 'Chid' Sadlier was a pioneer rugby league player with the St. George club during its earliest years. Sadlier was awarded Life Membership of the St. George Dragons in 1951 after 34 years service as a player, coach, selector and committeeman.

Sadlier died on 20 August 1968 at Sylvania, New South Wales.

References

St. George Dragons players
1896 births
1968 deaths
Australian rugby league coaches
Australian rugby league administrators
Australian rugby league players
Rugby league wingers
Rugby league locks
Rugby league players from Sydney